Fernan or Fernán is both a given name and a surname. Notable people with the name include:

 Fernán Blázquez de Cáceres (fl. 14th-century), Spanish nobleman
 Fernán Caballero (1796–1877), Spanish novelist
 Fernando Fernán Gómez (1921–2007), Spanish actor
 Fernán González of Castile (died 970), Castilian nobleman
 Fernán Gutiérrez de Castro (1180–1233), Spanish nobleman
 Fernán Mirás (born 1969), Argentine actor
 Fernán Pérez de Guzmán (1376–1458), Spanish historian
 Fernan Perez de Oliva (1492–1533), Spanish writer
 Fernán Silva Valdés (1887–1975), Uruguayan writer
 Juan Bello Fernán (born 1965), Spanish writer
 Marcelo Fernan (1926–1999), Filipino lawyer and judge